Rakesh Sachan (born 20 December 1964) is an Indian politician and currently a Cabinet minister in  Ministry of MSME, Khadi, Village Industries, Sericulture, Textile, Government of Uttar Pradesh & Member of Uttar Pradesh Legislative Assembly 2022 (MLA) from Bhognipur constituency and, who has also served two terms in the Uttar Pradesh Legislative Assembly (1993–96 and 2002–2007) and in 2009 was elected as a Member of Parliament (MP) from the Fatepur Lok Sabha constituency, on the Samajwadi Party ticket. He stood for re-election from the same constituency in 2014, again as a member of the Samajwadi Party, but lost.

Sachan switched political parties, and joined the Indian National Congress on 2 March 2019. In the 2019 Indian general election he was a candidate from the Fatehpur Lok Sabha constituency as a member of INC.

In January 2022 he joined the Bharatiya Janata Party (BJP), and became the Cabinet Minister in the Second Yogi Adityanath ministry. He contested from Vidhan Sabha constituency of Bhognipur in the 2022 Uttar Pradesh Legislative Assembly election.

Early life and education
Sachan was born on 20 December 1964 in Kanpur, Uttar Pradesh to his father Udai Narayan Singh. He married Seema Sachan, they have two sons and one daughter. He did his early schooling from  Kanpur. He attended the  Kanpur University and attained Bachelor of Science.

False Media Trials 2023

References

Living people
Lok Sabha members from Uttar Pradesh
India MPs 2009–2014
1964 births
Samajwadi Party politicians
People from Fatehpur district
Indian National Congress politicians
Janata Dal politicians
Bharatiya Janata Party politicians from Uttar Pradesh
Uttar Pradesh MLAs 2022–2027
Samajwadi Party politicians from Uttar Pradesh